Peninnah Tibagwa Kasule, is an Ugandan lawyer and corporate executive, who serves as the Company Secretary and Head of Legal & Board Affairs at Centenary Rural Development Bank. In that role, she is a member of the bank's senior management team.

Early life and education
She was born in the Western Region of Uganda. She attended Gayaza High School, an all-girls boarding secondary school in Wakiso District, where she obtained her High School Diploma.

She holds a Bachelor of Laws degree and a Postgraduate Diploma in Legal Practice. She is a member of the Uganda Bar. She is also a Fellow of the Institute of Chartered Secretaries and Administrators (ICSA).

Career
Her duties at Centenary Bank include being the head of Compliance at the bank. As of 2018, her career spanned over 20 years. Prior to her present position, she worked as Company Secretary at United Assurance Company Limited, now part of the Ugandan subsidiaries of UAP Old Mutual Holdings.

Other considerations
She is the chairperson of the five-person board of trustees of Send a Cow Uganda, the local affiliate of the African Development Charity, Send a Cow.

See also
 Sarah Walusimbi
 Anne Abeja Muhwezi
 Agnes Tibayeyita Isharaza

References

External links
Website of Centenary Rural Development Bank

Living people
Ugandan business executives
21st-century Ugandan businesswomen
21st-century Ugandan businesspeople
Makerere University alumni
Law Development Centre alumni
Centenary Bank people
People educated at Gayaza High School
Year of birth missing (living people)
Ugandan women lawyers
20th-century Ugandan lawyers
21st-century Ugandan lawyers
People from Western Region, Uganda